Elisha Owusu (born 7 November 1997) is a professional footballer who plays as a midfielder for  club Auxerre. Born in France, he plays for the Ghana national team.

Club career
Owusu is a youth product of Lyon, joining in 2010 and became the captain of their reserve side. On 23 February 2017, Owusu signed his first professional contract with Lyon for 3 years. On 19 June 2018, he was loaned for the season to Sochaux. He made his professional debut with Sochaux in a 1–0 Ligue 2 loss to Grenoble on 27 July 2018.

On 21 June 2019, Owusu signed a four-year contract with Belgian club Gent. He left the club on 16 January 2023, joining Ligue 1 side Auxerre on a contract until June 2025.

International career
Born in France, Owusu is of Ghanaian descent. He debuted for the Ghana national team in a 1–1 2022 FIFA World Cup qualification tie with Nigeria on 29 March 2022, a result that helped Ghana qualify for the 2022 FIFA World Cup.

Honours 
Gent
 Belgian Cup: 2021–22

References

External links

LFP Profile

1997 births
Living people
French sportspeople of Ghanaian descent
Sportspeople from Montreuil, Seine-Saint-Denis
Citizens of Ghana through descent
Ghanaian footballers
Footballers from Seine-Saint-Denis
French footballers
Association football midfielders
Ghana international footballers

Ligue 2 players
Championnat National 2 players
Belgian Pro League players
FC Bourgoin-Jallieu players
FC Sochaux-Montbéliard players
Olympique Lyonnais players
K.A.A. Gent players
AJ Auxerre players
2022 FIFA World Cup players
Ghanaian expatriate footballers
Ghanaian expatriate sportspeople in Belgium
Expatriate footballers in Belgium